Chaluvanahalli is a village in Banavara Hobli, Arasikere Taluk, Hassan District, Karnataka, India Pin-573112.  It is located between Arasikere and Banavara, 11 km from Arasikere and 3 km from Banavara.
The National Highway NH-206 runs through the village outskirts. There is Hill view Place in the village called Gavimata. Gavimata has special caves called KallaraGavi (Robber's cave). These caves are mysterious. There is a Kalyani (Sacred Pond) and a temple.
The Chaluvanahalli has two historic temples, Ishwara Temple and Hanumaan Temple, in the interior of the village.

References

Villages in Hassan district